Metallic Attack: The Ultimate Tribute is a tribute album to heavy metal band Metallica. Motörhead's cover of "Whiplash" from this album won a Grammy for "Best Metal Performance" in 2005. The album contains covers of songs from Metallica's first five studio albums.

Track listing

See also
 Metallic Assault: A Tribute to Metallica
 Pianotarium: Piano Tribute to Metallica

References

Metallica tribute albums
2004 compilation albums
Heavy metal compilation albums